Sól-Kiczora  (previously Kiczora) is a village in the administrative district of Gmina Rajcza, within Żywiec County, Silesian Voivodeship, in southern Poland, close to the border with Slovakia.

Until 1 January 2014 Sól-Kiczora constituted integral part of the village Sól.

References

Kiczora